Bruno de Castro Engler Florencio de Almeida (born in Curitiba, Paraná, on 17 June 1997) is a Brazilian deputy for the state of Minas Gerais. He was elected in 2018. His seat is in Belo Horizonte.
He is affiliated with the Liberal Party (PL). He is anti-communist and a friend of conservative president Jair Bolsonaro.

References

External links 
 
 

Living people
1997 births
21st-century Brazilian politicians
Liberal Party (Brazil, 2006) politicians
Brazilian anti-communists
Members of the Chamber of Deputies (Brazil) from Minas Gerais
People from Curitiba